Eric Watson (born July 5, 1955) is an American jazz pianist.

Early life and education 
Watson was born in Wellesley, Massachusetts. He began playing piano as a child and performed in rock bands in Massachusetts. He studied classical music at the Oberlin Conservatory of Music in Oberlin, Ohio.

Career 
After graduating from college in 1978, Watson moved to Paris, where he performed jazz and classical music and worked as an accompanist for a dance group. is signed to a long-term recording contract with ACT Music. He has worked with double bass player John Lindberg, drummer Ed Thigpen, and Steve Lacy.

Discography
 Bulls Blood (1980)
 Conspiracy (1982)
 Child in the Sky (1985)
 Piano One (1985)
 Your Tonight Is My Tomorrow (1987)
 Charles Ives (1991)
 Palimpseste (1991)
 Listen to the Night (1994)
 Punk Circus (1994)
 Silent Hearts (1999)
 Full Metal Quartet (2000)
 Sketches of Solitude (2002)
 Road Movies (2004)
 Midnight Torsion (2009)
 Memories of Paris (2010)

With Steve Lacy
Spirit of Mingus (Free Lance, 1992)
Clangs (hat ART, 1993)

References

External links and sources
 http://nfo.net/calendar/jul05.htm
 http://www.actmusic.com/artist_detail.php?bio=1&manufacturers_id=28

Mainstream jazz pianists
American classical pianists
Male classical pianists
American male pianists
American jazz pianists
American jazz composers
American male jazz composers
20th-century classical composers
1955 births
Living people
Avant-garde jazz pianists
ACT Music artists
People from Wellesley, Massachusetts
Oberlin Conservatory of Music alumni
American male classical composers
American classical composers
20th-century American composers
20th-century American pianists
Jazz musicians from Massachusetts
Classical musicians from Massachusetts
21st-century classical pianists
20th-century American male musicians
21st-century American male musicians
21st-century American pianists
Sunnyside Records artists
20th-century jazz composers